Yunatstva Stadium, Yunost Stadium is a football stadium in Smorgon, Belarus. It is the home stadium of FC Smorgon of the Belarusian Premier League. The stadium holds 3,500 spectators.

External links
Stadium at FC Smorgon website
Stadium information 

Football venues in Belarus
Smarhon’